Abu Taher (1 November 1954 – 14 July 1999) was a Bangladeshi music composer.  He was notable for the songs like "Jalaiya Premer Batti", "Tore Putuler Moto Kore Sajiye" and "Beder Meye Jyotsna Ammay Kotha Diyeche". He has composed music for 20 films in his career. His repertoire includes films Beder Meye Jyotsna (1989), Khotipuron (1989), Beder Meye Jyotsna (1991), Gariyal Bhai (1992), Kkhoma (1992), Tumi Amar (1994), Rakhal Raja (1995), Buk Bhora Bhalobasha (1999) etc.

Early life and career
Abu Taher was born in a musical family. Veteran composer Alauddin Ali and his brother composer Mansur Ali are the paternal uncles of him. His younger brother is music director Ali Akram Shuvo. 

He has worked extensively with Sabina Yasmin, Runa Laila, Andrew Kishore, Kanak Chapa, Kumar Bishwajit and Dolly Sayontoni. Dolly Sayontoni has sung the maximum number of songs  in her career in his films, alongside Shawkat Ali Emon and Ali Akram Shuvo.

discography

References

External links
 

1954 births
1999 deaths
People from Dhaka
Bangladeshi composers